
Gmina Strzegom is an urban-rural gmina (administrative district) in Świdnica County, Lower Silesian Voivodeship, in south-western Poland.

Neighbouring gminas
Gmina Strzegom is bordered by the town of Świebodzice (German: Freiburg) the gminas of Dobromierz  (German: Hohenfriedeberg), Jaworzyna Śląska, Mściwojów, Udanin and Żarów.

Villages
Apart from the town of Strzegom (Stiegau), the gmina contains the villages of 

 Bartoszówek (Barzdorf)
 Goczałków (Gutschdorf)
 Goczałków Górny (Kohlhöhe)
 Godzieszówek(Günthersdorf)
 Granica (Halbendorf)
 Graniczna (Streit)
 Grochotów (Hoymsberg)
 Jaroszów(Järischau)
 Kostrza (Häslicht)
 Międzyrzecze (Haidau)
 Modlęcin (Ullersdorf)
 Morawa (Muhrau)
 Olszany (Ölse)
 Rogoźnica (Groß Rosen)
 Rusko (Rauske)
 Skarżyce (Grunau)
 Stanowice (Stanowitz, 1937–45: Standorf)
 Stawiska (Teichau)
 Tomkowice (Thomaswaldau)
 Wieśnica (Fehebeutel)
 Żelazów (Eisdorf)
 Źółkiewka(Pilgramshain)

Twin towns – sister cities

Gmina Strzegom is twinned with:

 Auerbach, Germany
 Hořice, Czech Republic
 Pavullo nel Frignano, Italy
 Pidhaitsi, Ukraine

 Znojmo, Czech Republic

References

Strzegom
Świdnica County